Ellebjerg station is a former station on the S-train network in Copenhagen, Denmark. It was in operation from 1972 until its closure in 2007. The former station is located where the Køge radial passes over Ellebjergvej. A new station, Ny Ellebjerg station (Ny meaning "New"), opened on 6 January 2007, a few hundred meters northeast of the former station.

The station was the first station ever to be closed on the S-train network.

References 

History of Valby
S-train (Copenhagen) stations
Railway stations opened in 1972
Railway stations closed in 2007
Disused railway stations in Denmark
Abandoned rapid transit stations
Railway stations in Denmark opened in the 20th century